Huaxi Yi and Miao Ethnic Township is an ethnic township for Yi people and Miao people. It is under the administration of Qianxi County in southern Guizhou province, China.

, it had one residential community and nine villages under its administration.

See also 
 List of township-level divisions of Guizhou

References 

Township-level divisions of Guizhou
Qianxi County, Guizhou
Miao ethnic townships
Yi ethnic townships